Operation Telic (Op TELIC) was the codename under which all of the United Kingdom's military operations in Iraq were conducted between the start of the invasion of Iraq on 19 March 2003 and the withdrawal of the last remaining British forces on 22 May 2011. The bulk of the mission ended on 30 April 2009 but around 150 troops, mainly from the Royal Navy, remained in Iraq until 22 May 2011 as part of the Iraqi Training and Advisory Mission. 46,000 troops were deployed at the onset of the invasion and the total cost of war stood at £9.24 billion in 2010.

Background
Operation Telic was one of the largest deployments of British forces since World War II. It was only approached in size by the 1991 Operation Granby deployment for the Gulf War and the 1956 Operation Musketeer Suez Crisis deployment. It was considerably larger than the 1982 Operation Corporate in the Falklands War, which saw around 30,000 personnel deployed and the Korean War, which saw fewer than 20,000 personnel deployed.

Some 9,500 of the British servicemen and women who deployed on Operation Telic for the invasion and its aftermath were reservists, from the Territorial Army and from the Royal Auxiliary Air Force Regiment.

Notice that additional British forces were deploying to the region (large numbers of RAF personnel were already deployed in Kuwait, Turkey and elsewhere in the region on Operations Northern Watch and Southern Watch) was given in three separate Commons statements by Geoff Hoon Secretary of State for Defence. On 7 January, the deployment of naval forces and Royal Marines was announced. 20 January saw the land forces deployment announced and 6 February the air forces. They were ready in time for hostilities to start on 19 March. When compared with the deployment of forces prior to the Gulf War things proceeded a great deal faster, with the slowest deploying elements taking 10 weeks to get from base to combat readiness in the theatre.

The deployment used 64 British and foreign flagged merchant vessels.

Telic means a purposeful or defined action (from Greek τέλος, telos). Unlike the United States who called their equivalent military deployment Operation Iraqi Freedom, the Ministry of Defence uses a computer to generate its names so that they carry no overtly political connotations. The meaning was initially unknown but as initial planning took place over the Christmas 2002 period, the term became jokingly known amongst personnel as a backronym for Tell Everyone Leave Is Cancelled.

Command structure
The force was commanded by a three-star tri-service headquarters. The commander of the operation was Air Marshal Brian Burridge, with Major General Peter Wall acting as his chief of staff. The headquarters was situated at CENTCOM headquarters in Qatar. The three services each had two-star commanders leading operations.

The Royal Navy commander was Rear Admiral David Snelson who had his headquarters ashore in Bahrain. The afloat Royal Navy commander was Commodore Jamie Miller, who had the aircraft carrier HMS Ark Royal as his flagship.

The 1st (United Kingdom) Armoured Division was commanded by Major General Robin Brims. Three army brigades were assigned to the division. 16 Air Assault Brigade was commanded by Brigadier 'Jacko' Page, 7th Armoured Brigade by Brigadier Graham Binns and 102nd Logistic Brigade by Brigadier Shaun Cowlam. 3 Commando Brigade was also under the operational command of the division and was commanded by Brigadier Jim Dutton.

The Royal Air Force commander was Air Vice-Marshal Glenn Torpy. Major General Wall took over command of 1st Armoured Division on 1 May 2003. He was replaced as Chief of Staff by Major General Barney White-Spunner. Rear Admiral Snelson was succeeded by Major General Tony Milton, Commandant General Royal Marines as maritime forces commander on 16 April 2003.

Post-invasion

On 11 July 2003, 1st Armoured Division handed control over south-east Iraq to 3rd Mechanised Division, Major General Wall was succeeded by Major General Graeme Lamb as commander of British ground forces in Iraq. Unlike the invasion period, by then there was a substantial presence from many nations other than America, Britain, Australia and Poland. In addition to British troops, 3rd Division now commanded Italian, Dutch, Danish, Czech, Lithuanian, Norwegian and New Zealand forces. 3rd Division handed over a new composite divisional headquarters on 28 December 2003. Major General Andrew Stewart took over from General Lamb as commander of British forces.

After the end of major operations, the main components of the British forces changed greatly. 3 Commando Brigade was withdrawn in early May and 16 Air Assault Brigade left later in the same month apart from a couple of infantry battalions. 7 Armoured Brigade remained until relieved by 19 Mechanised Brigade at the same time as 3rd Division took over from 1st Division. 102 Logistics Brigade was relieved by 101 Logistic Brigade in late May. Most of the RAF aircraft left the area with a few retained for patrols over Iraq and support of ground forces. British naval forces also returned to more usual levels, with two surface combatants, a tanker and a repair ship present in early July.

A further rotation of ground troops occurred in November 2003, with 19 Mechanised Brigade relieved by 20th Armoured Brigade; 20th Armoured Brigade in its turn being relieved by 1 Mechanised Brigade. In April 2004, 20th Armoured Brigade turned over its responsibilities to 1 Mechanised Brigade and Lieutenant General John McColl was appointed deputy commander of occupation ground forces. By July 2004 the British area saw its fifth commander when Major General Bill Rollo took over. At the end of 2004 General Rollo was succeeded by Major General Jonathan Riley and in November of that year 4 Armoured Brigade rotated to replace 1 Mechanised Brigade.

In May 2005, 4 Armoured Brigade was replaced by 12 Mechanised Brigade with the handover of responsibility taking place on 30 May.

In May 2006 7th Armoured Brigade, the Desert Rats were relieved by 20th Armoured Brigade under the command of Brigadier James Everard.

October 2006 saw 19 Light Brigade take over from 20th Armoured Brigade.

1 Mechanised Brigade provided HQ and troops for Op TELIC 10, deploying to Iraq in June 2007. During that tour, both the PJCC and Basra Palace were handed back to Iraqi control. They handed over to 4th Mechanised Brigade on 1 December 2007.

Equipment

The conflict saw over 100 fixed-wing aircraft and over 100 rotary-wing aircraft of virtually every type in the British inventory deployed. It also saw a 33 ship fleet, which was the largest taskforce deployed by the UK since the Falklands War. Some 120 Challenger 2 main battle tanks, 150 Warrior infantry fighting vehicles, 32 L131 self-propelled 155 mm howitzers and 36 L118 105 mm towed howitzers were deployed with the land forces, with reconnaissance vehicles and everything else that makes a modern mechanised and armoured force function.

During the post invasion phase, and following a number of British casualties blamed on inadequate equipment, a great deal of new equipment was purchased to help deal with the threats posed by insurgents. These included 166 armoured Pinzgauer Vector PPVs, 108 Mastiff PPVs, 145 enhanced FV430 Mk3 Bulldogs, Lockheed Martin Desert Hawk UAVs and 8 Britten-Norman Defender ISTAR aircraft.

Casualties

A total of 179 British Armed Forces personnel died serving on Operation Telic between the start of the campaign in March 2003 and the end of operations in July 2009; 136 in hostile incidents and the remaining 43 under non-hostile circumstances. Full non-fatal casualty records are currently only available for the period after 1 January 2006. From that date, 3,598 British personnel were wounded, injured or fell ill (315 wounded in action); 1,971 of whom required aeromedical evacuation. However, these totals are likely to rise significantly as and when full records for 2003 to 2006 become available. By 11 March 2007, more than 2,100 soldiers had returned from Iraq suffering from some form of mental illness, including PTSD.

In theatre both military and civilian casualties were treated by British Field Hospitals (FH), 22 FH in Kuwait and 34 FH in Iraq. 34 Field Hospital was made up of regular troops from their base in Strensall just outside York and members for volunteer reserve units from all over the country. A small 25 bedded hospital was sent across the Kuwait Iraq border in the early days of the war. On arrival at Shaibah the hospital was set up and ready to take casualties within six and a half hours. Everything that you would expect in a modern hospital was present with an Emergency Department, X-ray, Labs, Surgical Theatres x 2, ITU and a hospital ward.

In effect the hospital was based on the front line of the British area of responsibility and was the furthest forward medical unit in recent history. Casualties would often miss out the regimental aid posts and dressing stations and go straight to the hospital. Staff at the hospital worked 12 hour shifts without days off until more staff began to arrive around a month later. The 25 bedded unit kept working despite some nearby mortar fire while elements of a bigger hospital were bought in and a 200 bedded hospital was eventually built and staff moved over and suppimented,

The Hospital took over 3500 casualties through the front door of which more than 350 were major trauma cases and the hospital took around 70 paediatric trauma cases. Injuries included blunt trauma, gun shot wounds, shrapnel injuries and severe burns.

In fiction
The British television film The Mark of Cain depicted service of a fictional British Army unit, the 1st Battalion Northdale Rifles in Operation Telic, just after the end of combat operations and in the first stages of the occupation. 

A play, drawing on experiences of Black Watch soldiers during the war, was performed to much acclaim throughout Scotland in 2006.

See also

 List of British gallantry awards for the Iraq War
 List of United Kingdom Military installations used during Operation Telic
 Iraq Inquiry

References

External links

Campaign Medal for Operation Telic
British Fatalities in Iraq (MoD)
Gallery of images from 20th Armoured Brigade's tour of Iraq during Op TELIC 8 (MoD)

Telic
 
2003 in Iraq
Conflicts in 2003
British Armed Forces deployments
Wars involving the United Kingdom
Iraq–United Kingdom relations
21st-century Royal Air Force deployments
British Army deployments